When the Storm is Over is the third studio album recorded by the progressive bluegrass band New Grass Revival, released in 1977 on Flying Fish Records. The album includes a mix of covers, both traditional and contemporary, as well as band-penned songs.

In 1992, When the Storm is Over and the band's preceding 1975 album, Fly Through the Country, were re-released together on a dual-album CD.

Track listing
 "Four Days of Rain"  - 3:39
 "White Freight Liner Blues"  - 2:38
 "Sail to Australia"  - 3:48
 "When the Storm Is Over"  - 2:40
 "And He Says 'I Love You'"  - 3:42
 "Vamp in the Middle"  - 3:44
 "Like a Child in the Rain"  - 3:48
 "Tennessee Wagoner"  - 1:32
 "Colly Davis"  - 2:42
 "Crooked Smile"  - 7:42

Personnel 
 Sam Bush - mandolin, fiddle, lead vocals, guitar
 John Cowan - electric bass, lead vocals
 Courtney Johnson - banjo, guitar, vocals
 Curtis Burch - guitar, Dobro, vocals
 Chuck Cochran - electric piano
 Kenny Malone - congas, percussion
 Bobby Wood - piano 

New Grass Revival albums
1977 albums